Georg Gebel (1685–1750) was a German composer, organist, and innovator in the construction of keyboard instruments.

Gebel was born in Breslau, and became a tailor's apprentice, but ran away from the apprenticeship to study music. He studied under Winkler and Krause, and became organist at Brieg in 1709 and at Breslau in 1713. He died in Breslau in 1750.

He invented a clavichord with quarter tones and a clavicymbalum with a pedal keyboard. His numerous compositions were not published, but included an oratorio, cantatas, masses, psalms, canons, organ pieces, and clavichord music.

His son, Georg Gebel the Younger, was also a noted musician and composer.

References

1685 births
1750 deaths
German classical organists
German male organists
German musical instrument makers
German Baroque composers
Musicians from Wrocław
People from Austrian Silesia
18th-century keyboardists
18th-century classical composers
German classical composers
German male classical composers
18th-century German composers
18th-century German male musicians
Male classical organists